Don't Look Back is the debut album by Slovak-based recording artist Celeste Buckingham, released on April 3, 2012 through a distribution by EMI Records.

Reception

Critical response

Don't Look Back received very favorable reviews from music critics. The REPORT magazine praised the album as "one of the best debut records that has ever been released by the finalists of any local talent contest". Complimenting young artist for "having surpassed all fellow singers of her own", Daniel Maršalík attributed much of "Buckingham's allure" to her ability to see beyond the horizons of her homebase in the first place. Beside the album's anthem "Run Run Run and its titular ballad, he would find the most aspiring up-tempo tracks, namely "Hello Stranger", "Bleeding" and "Blue Guitar". Giving the set six (out of seven) points, he only reproached the Slovak cut "Mám ťa málo", respectively the spoken intro of "Stupid Love Games", both of which he saw "disturbing to no purpose".

In a review published in the online newspaper MusicServer.cz, Honza Balušek introduced the product as "a fresh and brilliant record", continuing further: "However unbelievable, (at the time of recording) sixteen-year-old Celeste Buckingham is on the absolute top of the best SuperStar'''s finalists... Wow!" Despite noting the broad genre influences, such as e.g. Adele, Dido, Rihanna and Katy Perry, the columnist stressed Buckingham's skills as a sovereign composer. Except for the opening tune "Nobody Knows", reportedly disliked due to "[its] wrecked rhythm", he felt all of the album's tracks as "radio-friendly hits." Among other, he lauded "Run Run Run" as his favorite and, especially, the singer's duet "Heart" featuring Noah Ellenwood. Unlike Maršalík of the REPORT'', he saw also a potential in her collaboration with Martin Harich, describing their result ("Mám ťa málo") to sound "like the best in the Slovak classic pop" music. Eventually, he graded the album with eight points (out of ten in total).

Chart performance
On July 26, 2012, the album entered the Top 50 Prodejní, a chart effective for both countries Czech Republic and Slovakia, debuting at number forty. The following week, on August 3, 2012, the set topped its chart run at number thirty-seven. In total, the record would spend four weeks on the list.

Track listing

Credits and personnel

 Celeste Buckingham - lead vocalist, writer, lyrics, producer
 Andrej Hruška - writer, producer, guitar
 Martin Šrámek - writer, producer, keyboard
 Marián Slávka - drums
 Maťo Ivan - bass guitar

 Carmel Buckingham - writer
 Martin Harich - backing vocalist, writer
 Noah Scott Ellenwood - backing vocalist
 LittleBeat - recording studio
 EMI Czech Republic - distributor

Charts

Singles

Release history

See also
 Celeste Buckingham discography
 The 100 Greatest Slovak Albums of All Time

References
General

 
Specific

External links 
 CelesteBuckingham.com > Music
 AllMusic.com > Celeste Buckingham > Don't Look Back

2012 albums
Celeste Buckingham albums